The 2016 UEFA European Under-17 Championship was the 15th edition of the UEFA European Under-17 Championship (34th edition if the Under-16 era is included), the annual European international youth football championship contested by the men's under-17 national teams of UEFA member associations. Azerbaijan, which were selected by UEFA on 20 March 2012, hosted the tournament between 5 and 21 May 2016.

A total of 16 teams competed in the final tournament, with players born on or after 1 January 1999 eligible to participate. Each match had a duration of 80 minutes, consisting of two halves of 40 minutes with a 15-minute half-time.

Portugal were crowned champions for the second time in the under-17 era, and sixth time overall, after beating Spain in the final 5–4 through a penalty shootout. France were the defending champions, but were eliminated in the group stage.

Qualification

The national teams from all 54 UEFA member associations entered the competition. With Azerbaijan automatically qualified as hosts, the other 53 teams contested a qualifying competition to determine the remaining 15 spots in the final tournament. The qualifying competition consisted of two rounds: the qualifying round, which took place in autumn 2015, and the elite round, which took place in spring 2016.

Qualified teams
The following 16 teams qualified for the final tournament:

Note: All appearance statistics include only U-17 era (since 2002).

Notes

Final draw
The final draw was held on 8 April 2016, 12:00 AZT (UTC+4), at the Baku Olympic Stadium in Baku, Azerbaijan. The 16 teams were drawn into four groups of four teams. Hosts Azerbaijan were assigned to position A1 in the draw, while the other teams were seeded according to their results in the qualification elite round, with the seven best elite round group winners (counting all elite round results) placed in Pot 1 and drawn to positions 1 and 2 in the groups, and the remaining eight teams placed in Pot 2 and drawn to positions 3 and 4 in the groups.
Pot 1: Portugal, Serbia, Ukraine, Germany, Denmark, Italy, France
Pot 2: Belgium (eighth best group winner), England, Austria, Netherlands, Bosnia and Herzegovina, Sweden, Scotland, Spain

Venues
The tournament was hosted in four venues, all in Baku:

Squads

Each national team had to submit a squad of 18 players.

Match officials
A total of 8 referees, 12 assistant referees and 4 fourth officials were appointed for the final tournament.

Referees
 Petr Ardeleánu
 Svein-Erik Edvartsen
 Bartosz Frankowski
 Gunnar Jarl Jónsson
 Fran Jović
 Peter Kráľovič
 Ville Nevalainen
 Mitja Žganec

Assistant referees
 Balázs Buzás
 Andrew Christiansen
 Lazaros Dimitriadis
 Marios Dimitriadis
 Emmett Dynan
 Vasile Ermișchin
 Alain Heiniger
 Neeme Neemlaid
 Edward Spiteri
 Ceyhun Sesigüzel
 Georgi Todorov
 Levan Varamishvili

Fourth officials
 Aliyar Aghayev
 Alain Durieux
 Orkhan Mammadov
 Sergejus Slyva

Group stage

The final tournament schedule was confirmed on 12 April 2016.

The group winners and runners-up advanced to the quarter-finals.

Tiebreakers
The teams were ranked according to points (3 points for a win, 1 point for a draw, 0 points for a loss). If two or more teams were equal on points on completion of the group matches, the following tie-breaking criteria were applied, in the order given, to determine the rankings:
Higher number of points obtained in the group matches played among the teams in question;
Superior goal difference resulting from the group matches played among the teams in question;
Higher number of goals scored in the group matches played among the teams in question;
If, after having applied criteria 1 to 3, teams still had an equal ranking, criteria 1 to 3 were reapplied exclusively to the group matches between the teams in question to determine their final rankings. If this procedure did not lead to a decision, criteria 5 to 9 applied;
Superior goal difference in all group matches;
Higher number of goals scored in all group matches;
If only two teams had the same number of points, and they were tied according to criteria 1 to 6 after having met in the last round of the group stage, their rankings were determined by a penalty shoot-out (not used if more than two teams had the same number of points, or if their rankings were not relevant for qualification for the next stage).
Lower disciplinary points total based only on yellow and red cards received in the group matches (red card = 3 points, yellow card = 1 point, expulsion for two yellow cards in one match = 3 points);
Drawing of lots.

All times were local, AZT (UTC+4).

Group A

Group B

Group C

Group D

Knockout stage
In the knockout stage, a penalty shoot-out was used to decide the winner if necessary (no extra time was played).

Following a consultation between the Association of Football Federations of Azerbaijan (AFFA) and UEFA, it was decided to change the venue for the semi-finals and final from the Baku Olympic Stadium to the Dalga Arena and Bakcell Arena, respectively.

Bracket

Quarter-finals

Semi-finals

Final

Goalscorers
7 goals

 José Gomes

Note: José Gomes scored a total of 16 goals in the 2014–15 and 2015–16 season (including qualifying), making him the competition's all-time top scorer.

4 goals

 Abel Ruiz

3 goals

 Reiss Nelson
 Renat Dadashov
 Yari Otto
 Brahim Díaz

2 goals

 Christoph Baumgartner
 Benjamin Hadžić
 Atakan Akkaynak
 Diogo Dalot
 Miguel Luís
 Fran García
 Joel Asoro

1 goal

 Valentino Müller
 Romano Schmid
 Murad Mahmudov
 Farid Nabiyev
 Adrien Bongiovanni
 Milan Corryn
 Loïs Openda
 Sebastian Buch Jensen
 Jens Odgaard
 George Hirst
 Ben Morris
 Mason Mount
 Kai Havertz
 Sam Schreck
 Moise Kean
 Marco Olivieri
 Andrea Pinamonti
 Gianluca Scamacca
 Tahith Chong
 Ché Nunnely
 Dylan Vente
 Mesaque Djú
 Gedson Fernandes
 Domingos Quina
 Dejan Joveljić
 Igor Maksimović
 Pol Lozano
 Jordi Mboula
 Teddy Bergqvist
 Serhiy Buletsa
 Andriy Kulakov
 Denys Yanakov

1 own goal

 Luca Meisl (playing against Germany)
 Elchin Asadov (playing against Portugal)
 Tom Baack (playing against Bosnia and Herzegovina)
 Marko Ilić (playing against Netherlands)

Team of the Tournament

Goalkeepers
 Diogo Costa
 Iñaki Peña

Defenders
 Dujon Sterling
 Dan-Axel Zagadou
 Matthijs de Ligt
 Diogo Dalot
 Diogo Leite
 Rúben Vinagre

Midfielders
 Kai Havertz
 Gedson Fernandes
 Florentino
 Quina
 Brahim Díaz
 Manu Morlanes

Forwards
 Reiss Nelson
 Tahith Chong
 Jota
 José Gomes

References

External links

Azerbaijan 2016, UEFA.com

 
2016
Under-17 Championship
2016 Uefa European Under-19 Championship
2015–16 in Azerbaijani football
2016
May 2016 sports events in Europe
2016 in youth sport
2016 in youth association football
2010s in Baku